Colonel Charles Chapman (died 2 August 1795) was Commander-in-Chief, India.

Military career
Educated at Balliol College, Oxford, Chapman served as commanding officer of the 3rd European Regiment in Bengal before becoming Commander-in-Chief, India in December 1773.

He became discredited as an elderly officer whose chief aim was to recoup his gambling losses and was forced from office in January 1774. He retired to Bath and died in 1795.

References

1795 deaths
British Commanders-in-Chief of India
Alumni of Balliol College, Oxford
British East India Company Army officers
Year of birth unknown